Gökhan Öztürk (born 22 March 1990) is a Turkish professional footballer who currently plays as a midfielder for Tepecikspor. He was also a youth international.

Career
Öztürk began his career with Tepecikspor in 2000. Galatasaray transferred the midfielder in 2001. He was trained in the Galatasaray youth system and was transferred to Gaziantepspor in 2009.

References

External links

1990 births
Living people
Tepecikspor footballers
Galatasaray S.K. footballers
Gaziantepspor footballers
Çaykur Rizespor footballers
TKİ Tavşanlı Linyitspor footballers
Altınordu F.K. players
1922 Konyaspor footballers
Ankara Demirspor footballers
Süper Lig players
TFF First League players
TFF Second League players
Turkey youth international footballers
Turkish footballers
Association football midfielders